Free TV may refer to :
 Free TV (MENA), a Pan Arab musical television channel
 Free TV (Italy), an Italian regional television channel
 FreeTV Australia, the industry body representing free-to-air Australian TV networks
 Free TV Alliance, a collaboration between four European free digital satellite television broadcasters to promote free satellite TV

See also
 Free-to-air television